Until 1 January 2007 Langå municipality was a municipality (Danish, kommune) in Aarhus County on the Jutland peninsula in central Denmark.  The municipality covered an area of 133 km2, and had a total population of 8.396 (2005).  Its last mayor was Hanne Nielsen, a member of the Social Democrats (Socialdemokraterne) political party. The main town and site of its municipal council was the town of Langå.

Langå municipality ceased to exist due to Kommunalreformen ("The Municipality Reform" of 2007).  The southern part of Langå municipality was merged with Hadsten, Hammel, Hinnerup, and Hvorslev municipalities to form the new Favrskov municipality.  This created a municipality with an area of 487 km2 and a total population of ca. 41,596 (2005).  The new municipality belongs to Region Midtjylland ("Mid-Jutland Region"). The remainder of Langå municipality was incorporated into an enlarged Randers municipality.

External links 
 Favrskov municipality's website (Danish only)
 Randers municipality's website (Danish only)

References 
 Municipal statistics: NetBorger Kommunefakta, delivered from KMD aka Kommunedata (Municipal Data)
 Municipal mergers and neighbors: Eniro new municipalities map

Former municipalities of Denmark
Randers Municipality